Nyhart may refer to:

Lynn K. Nyhart, American historian of science
Nyhart, Missouri, an unincorporated community in Bates County, Missouri, US